The following is a list of the musical compositions of Domenico Cimarosa (1749-1801).

Operas

 Le stravaganze del conte (carnival 1772 Naples Teatro San Giovanni dei Fiorentini) [Le magie di Merlina e Zoroastro; Le pazzie di Stelladaura e Zoroastro]
 La finta parigina (carnival 1773 Naples Teatro Nuovo)
 I sdegni per amore (1.1776 Naples Teatro Nuovo)
 I matrimoni in ballo (carnival 1776 Naples Teatro Nuovo)
 La frascatana nobile (winter 1776 Naples Teatro Nuovo) [La finta frascatana]
 I tre amanti (carnival 1777 Rome Teatro Valle) [Le gare degl'amanti]
 Il fanatico per gli antichi Romani (spring 1777 Naples Teatro San Giovanni dei Fiorentini)
 L'Armida immaginaria (summer 1777 Naples Teatro (San Giovanni) dei Fiorentini)
 Gli amanti comici, o sia La famiglia in scompiglio (1778? ?Naples Teatro (San Giovanni) dei Fiorentini; carnival 1796 Crema) [Il matrimonio in commedia; La famiglia stravagante, ovvero Gli amanti comici]
 Il ritorno di Don Calandrino (carnival 1778 Rome Teatro Valle) [Armidoro e Laurina]
 Le stravaganze d'amore (1778 Naples Teatro San Giovanni dei Fiorentini)
 Il matrimonio per industria (1778? Naples?) [?]
 La contessina (summer 1778 Bologna) [?] [+ G. Astaritta, F.L. Gassmann]
 Il matrimonio per raggiro (1778/9? Rome?; carnival 1802 Rome Teatro Valle) [La donna bizzarra]
 L'italiana in Londra (carnival 1779 Rome Teatro Valle) [La virtù premiata]
 L'infedeltà fedele (summer 1779 Naples, Teatro del Fondo)
 Le donne rivali (carnival 1780 Rome Teatro Valle) [et al.]
 Caio Mario (carnival 1780 Teatro delle Dame)
 I finti nobili (carnival 1780 Naples Teatro San Giovanni dei Fiorentini)
 Il falegname (1780 Naples F) [L'artista]
 L'avviso ai maritati (1780? ?Naples Teatro San Giovanni dei Fiorentini) [?]
 Il capriccio drammatico (1781? Turin?; 1794 London)
 Il pittor parigino (carnival 1781 Rome Teatro Valle) [Le brame deluse]
 Alessandro nell'Indie (carnival 1781 Rome A)
 Li sposi per accidente  (Carnival 1781, Naples Teatro San Giovanni dei Fiorentini) 
 L'amante combattuto dalle donne di Punto (1781 Naples Teatro San Giovanni dei Fiorentini) [La biondolina; La giardiniera fortunata]
 Giunio Bruto (aut.1781 Verona)G
 Giannina e Bernardone (aut.1781 Venice SS) [Il villano geloso]
 Il convito (carnival 1782 Venice SS) [Der Schmaus]
 L'amor costante (carnival 1782 Rome Teatro Valle) [Giulietta e Armidoro]
 L'eroe cinese (13.8.1782 Naples SC)
 La ballerina amante (1782 Naples Teatro San Giovanni dei Fiorentini) [L'amante ridicolo]
 La Circe (carnival 1783 Milan S)
 I due baroni di Rocca Azzurra (carnival 1783 Rome Teatro Valle) [Dve nevesty; I due baroni; La sposa in contrasto; Il barone deluso]
 La villana riconosciuta (1783 Naples Teatro del Fondo) [La villanella rapita]
 Oreste (13.8.1783 Naples SC)
 Chi dell'altrui si veste presto si spoglia (1783 Naples F) [Nina e Martuffo]
 Il vecchio burlato (1783 Venice) [?]
 I matrimoni impensati (carnival 1784 Rome Teatro Valle) [La bella greca]
 L'apparenza inganna, o sia La villeggiatura (spring 1784 Naples F)
 La vanità delusa (spring 1784 Florence P) [Il mercato di Malmantile]
 L'Olimpiade (10.7.1784 Vicenza)
 I due supposti conti, ossia Lo sposo senza moglie (aut.1784 Milan S) [Lo sposo ridicolo]
 Artaserse (26.12.1784 Turin TR)
 Il barone burlato (1784 Naples Teatro Nuovo) [rev. Il pittor parigino] [+ F. Cipolla]
 Li finti conti (spring 1785 Turin, Gallo-Ughetti) [?]
 I fratelli papamosche (spring 1785 Turin, Gallo-Ughetti) [?]
 Le statue parlanti (1785 Correggio) [?]
 Il marito disperato (1785 Naples F) [Il marito geloso; Die bestrafte Eifersucht]
 La donna sempre al suo peggior s'appiglia (1785 Naples Teatro Nuovo)
 Il credulo (carnival 1786 Naples Teatro Nuovo) [La baronessa stramba; Il credulo deluso]
 Le trame deluse (1786 Naples Teatro Nuovo) [L'amor contrastato; Li raggiri scoperti]
 L'impresario in angustie (1786 Naples Teatro Nuovo) [Die theatralischen Abenteuer]
 La baronessa stramba (1786 Naples Teatro Nuovo) [rev. I matrimoni in ballo] [Il credulo]
 Il Sagrifizio d’Abramo (1786)
 Gli amanti alla prova (1786 Naples) [?]
 L'impostore punito (1786/7 Turin C) [?]
 Volodimiro (carnival 1787 Turin TR)
 Il fanatico burlato (1787 Naples Teatro del Fondo) [La burla felice; Der adelsüchtige Bürger]
 La felicità inaspettata (3.1788 St Petersburg E)
 La vergine del sole (1788? ?St Petersburg E; 6.11.1789 St Petersburg BK)
 La scuffiara (1788) [?]
 La Cleopatra (27.9.1789 St Petersburg E) [Cleopatra e Marc'Antonio]
 Il matrimonio segreto (7.2.1792 Vienna B), score
 Sophie et Dorval [rev. Il matrimonio segreto]
 Il matrimonio per susurro [?]
 La calamità dei cuori (1792/3 Vienna B) [?]
 Contrattempi (1793 Bonn) [?]
 Amor rende sagace (1.4.1793 Vienna B)
 I traci amanti (19.6.1793 Naples Teatro Nuovo) [Il padre alla moda, ossia Lo Sbarco di Mustanzir Bassà; Gli turchi amanti; Les amants Turcs]
 Il maestro di cappella (2.7.1793 Berlin, Germany)
 Le astuzie femminili (26.8.1794 Naples Teatro (San Giovanni) dei Fiorentini)
 La pupilla astuta (1794 Naples Teatro del Fondo) [?]
 La serva innamorata (1794 Naples F) [?]
 Penelope (carnival 1795 Naples Teatro del Fondo)
 Le nozze in garbuglio (1795 Messina)
 L'impegno superato (1795 Naples Teatro del Fondo)
 La finta ammalata (1796 Lisbon)
 I nemici generosi (carnival 1796 Rome Teatro Valle) [Il duello per complimento]
 Gli Orazi e i Curiazi (carnival 1797 Venice F)
 La morte di Assalonne (? Florence, Oratorio) [rev. Gli Orazi ed i Curiazi]
 Achille all'assedio di Troja (carnival 1797 Rome A)
 L'imprudente fortunato (carnival 1797 Rome Teatro Valle)
 Artemisia regina di Caria (summer 1797 Naples SC)
 Attilio Regolo (carnival 1797 Reggio) [?]
 Le nozze di Lauretta (1797? Turin) [?]
 L'apprensivo raggirato (1798 Naples Teatro San Giovanni dei Fiorentini)
 Il secreto (aut.1798 Turin C)
 Semiramide (1799 Naples F) [?]
 Il conte di bell'amore [?]
 L'arte contro l'arte (carnival 1800 Alexandria) [?]
 Artemisia (carnival 1801 Venice F)
 Il nuovo podestà (spring 1802 Bologna) [?]
 Tito Vespasiano (1821 Lisbon) [?]
 La discordia fortunata [?]
 L'ajo nell'imbarazzo [?]
 Le donne vendicate [?]
 Il cavalier del dente [?]
 La Molinara (incomplete) [?]

Cantatas

 Atene Edificata (1788-06-29 St Petersburg Hermitage Theatre)
Cantata per Ferdinando IV (1799)

Oratorios 

 Giuditta, Venice (?1782)
 Absalom (Absalon, actio sacra), Venice (1782); as Assalonne, Milan (1819)
 Il sacrificio d'Abramo Naples, Fondo (1786)
 Il trionfo delle fede, Naples (1794)
 Il martirio, Naples (1795)
 S Filippo Neri che risuscita Paolo Massimi, Rome (1797) [incl. music from Penelope, arr. P. Bonfichi]

Other sacred works 

 Mass in F for TTB (1765)
 Mass in F for SATB (1768)
 Mass in C for SATB (1772)
 Mass in D for SATB (?1776)
 Mass in G for SATB (1782)
 Missa pro defunctis in G minor for SATB, St Petersburg (1787)
 Mass in E for SATB (1796)
 Mass in C minor for SATB (1799)
 Messe brève in G for TTB
 Messe pour l'Avent et le Carême in G for SATB
 Magnificat for SATB (1769)
 Gloria patri for Soprano (1769)
 Te Deum for SATB (1798)
 Psalm XII for Soprano (1769)
 Laudate for Soprano (1769)
 Salve regina for Sop and Bass 
 Litanie for SATB (1775)
 Domine for SATB (1782)
 Quoniam for Soprano (1770)
 Antra, ubis quaestus echo for Alto (1780)
 Pave coelum for Alto (1782)
 Memento Domine David for Bass
 Quasi leo for Bass (1782)

Instrumental music

 88 sonate for harpsichord or fortepiano
 Sinfonia in B major for 2 oboi, 2 corni e archi
 Sinfonia in D major (attributed to Josef Mysliveček)
 Concerto for harpsichord or fortepiano in si bemolle maggiore
 Concerto for Oboe and String Orchestra (arrangement by Arthur Benjamin based on music from the keyboard sonatas)
 Concerto per 2 flauti e orchestra in sol maggiore (1793)
 Sestetto in G major for fortepiano, fagotto, 2 violini, viola e violoncello
 Sestetto in F major for fortepiano organizzato, arpa, fagotto, violino, viola da gamba e violoncello
 6 quartets (re maggiore, sol maggiore, do maggiore, fa maggiore, do maggiore, la minore) per flauto, violino, viola e violoncello
 Six Symphonies de Strážnice (Musée morave Brno)
Hymn of the Partenopean Republic (Text (???) (1799)
"Marcia da suonarsi sotto l'albero della libertà per il bruciamento delle immagini dei tiranni" (1799)

Editions
 Stefano Faglia, Franca Saini (ed.): Il mercato di Malmantile, Florence, 1784. Monza, Accademia Musicale IAMR, 2012. Lucca, Libreria Musicale Italiana (LIM), 2012.
 Stefano Faglia, Franca Saini (ed.): Li due Baroni, Rome, 1783. Monza, Accademia Musicale IAMR, 2013. Lucca, Libreria Musicale Italiana (LIM), 2013.

References

Lists of compositions by composer